Alamito Creek is a stream in the U.S. state of Texas. It is a tributary of the Rio Grande, which is joins near Presidio, Texas.

See also
 List of rivers of Texas
 List of tributaries of the Rio Grande

References

Rivers of Texas
Tributaries of the Rio Grande
Bodies of water of Presidio County, Texas